Kansas City BBQ may refer to:

Kansas City-style barbecue, one of the four predominant regional styles of barbecue in the United States
Kansas City Barbeque, a restaurant and bar in San Diego, California